Triazinanes are a class of nitrogen-containing heterocycles. They exist in three isomeric forms, 1,3,5-triazinanes being common. The triazinanes have six-membered cyclohexane-like ring but with three carbons replaced by nitrogens. Most commonly, the amines are tertiary.

References 

 Heterocyclic Chemistry T.L. Gilchrist 1985  (1997)

See also
 6-membered rings with one nitrogen atom: Piperidine
 6-membered rings with two nitrogen atoms: Diazinane
 Hexahydropyrimidine
 Hexahydropyridazine
 Triazine

Heterocyclic compounds with 1 ring
Nitrogen heterocycles
Six-membered rings
Polyamines